Georgi Nikolov (born 12 March 1938) is a Bulgarian rower. He competed in the men's coxed pair event at the 1968 Summer Olympics.

References

1938 births
Living people
Bulgarian male rowers
Olympic rowers of Bulgaria
Rowers at the 1968 Summer Olympics
Rowers from Sofia